Tuanjie Square or Unity Square is the main square in the center of Hotan,  Xinjiang Uyghur Autonomous Region, China. It is so called to promote unity among the various ethnic minorities in the region, where the Uyghur people are in the majority.

In the center of the square stands the statue of Kurban Tulum shaking hands with Mao Zedong. The southeast corner has a night market, visited by both local people and tourists.

See also
 Kurban Tulum
 Propaganda in the People's Republic of China

References

Squares in China
Hotan Prefecture